Newham South was a parliamentary constituency in the London Borough of Newham, in east London.  It returned one Member of Parliament (MP)  to the House of Commons of the Parliament of the United Kingdom.

History
The constituency was created for the February 1974 general election, and abolished for the 1997 general election.

Boundaries
The constituency consisted of the southern portion of the London Borough of Newham, the wards of Beckton, Bemersyde, Canning Town and Grange, Custom House and Silvertown, Hudsons, Ordnance, Plaistow, and South. It included North Woolwich, which had previously been included in seats with the rest of Woolwich on the other side of the River Thames.

Members of Parliament

Election results

Elections in the 1970s

Elections in the 1980s

Elections in the 1990s

References

Bibliography

Parliamentary constituencies in London (historic)
Constituencies of the Parliament of the United Kingdom established in 1974
Constituencies of the Parliament of the United Kingdom disestablished in 1997
Politics of the London Borough of Newham